Broxholme is a village and civil parish in the West Lindsey district of Lincolnshire, England. According to the 2001 Census, Broxholme had a population of 58. At the 2011 census the population remained less than 100 and was included in the civil parish of South Carlton.

Broxholme Grade II listed Anglican parish church is dedicated to All Saints. It was rebuilt in 1857.

References

External links

"Broxholme", Genuki.org.uk. Retrieved 3 July 2011

Villages in Lincolnshire
Civil parishes in Lincolnshire
West Lindsey District